Trnová may refer to:

 Trnová (Plzeň-North District), a village in the Czech Republic
 Trnová (Prague-West District), a village in the Czech Republic